Jilasu is a tehsil, or administrative division, located in the Chamoli district of the Indian state of Uttarakhand. It is situated between Nandaprayag and Karnaprayag on the river Alakananda.

The tehsil was created in 2014, along with other tehsils like Nandaprayag. It has 29 hill villages and is completely located in the middle Himalayas. The nearest airport is Gauchar(around 20 km), although regular services are only up to Jolly Grant in Dehradun.

In terms of economy, subsistence agriculture is the main source of livelihood for the people of Jilasu. There are also small-scale industries, such as handloom weaving, which provide employment to a significant number of people in the area. Tourism is another source of livelihood, specially during Char-Dham Yatra season.

The Rishikesh-Karnaprayag line is expected to have stations, tunnels and other infrastructure in Jilasu and would significantly aid to raise the living standards of the people.

References

Chamoli district